Return of Saturn is the fourth studio album by American rock band No Doubt, released on April 11, 2000, by Trauma Records and Interscope Records. It marked the band's first album as a quartet, following the departure of original keyboardist Eric Stefani in 1994. After touring for two and a half years to promote their breakthrough third studio album, Tragic Kingdom (1995), No Doubt wrote several dozen songs for its follow-up and eventually settled on working with producer Glen Ballard. Creating the album became a tumultuous process lasting two years, during which there was dissension among band members and between the band and its label. The album was completed after the band returned to the studio and recorded what became two of its singles.

The album maintains the ska punk and reggae influences of the band's previous work, but with slower, more ballad-like songs. The lyrics to many of the songs describe singer Gwen Stefani's pining for a more domestic life, contrasting that with her commitment to a music career.

Upon its release, Return of Saturn received favorable reviews from music critics, although several of them were divided over its different sound to its predecessor. It debuted at number two on the Billboard 200 but was unable to measure up to the sales of Tragic Kingdom. The album spawned four singles, only one of which charted on the Billboard Hot 100. At the 43rd Grammy Awards, Return of Saturn was nominated for Best Rock Album.

Background
After the success of No Doubt's breakthrough album Tragic Kingdom (1995), the band wrote more than 20 songs for a new album, influenced by artists such as the Cure. Having toured extensively for two and a half years since the release of Tragic Kingdom, they initially had trouble producing material and decided to experiment with new sounds. Many of the songs were written in a rented house in Hollywood Hills, Los Angeles, where bassist Tony Kanal was living. During early production in mid-1998 the band worked on seven tracks in Los Angeles with Matthew Wilder, who had produced Tragic Kingdom, but had creative differences with him. They planned on going to New York City to work with producer Michael Beinhorn, who had produced for alternative rock acts such as Red Hot Chili Peppers, Hole, and Soundgarden.

When scheduling conflicts arose with Beinhorn, the band interviewed several producers and decided on Glen Ballard, who had produced Alanis Morissette's Jagged Little Pill (1995), because of pressure from manager Jimmy Iovine and Ballard's belief in not using heavy production techniques. Ballard went through the band's 40 demos and ruled out half of them. They frequently missed due dates, arguing that hurrying the album to cash in on the success of Tragic Kingdom was unwise since three years had passed. In early 1999, No Doubt released "New", co-produced by Talking Heads member Jerry Harrison, for the soundtrack to the 1999 film Go.

By that July, the band stopped work on the album, intending to be done with the record. Interscope, however, recommended that they continue writing so they would have a more marketable single. The band was split when singer Gwen Stefani offered to do so but drummer Adrian Young and guitarist Tom Dumont did not want to, hesitant to trust Interscope after it had sublicensed Tragic Kingdom to Trauma Records. After a brief break, Dumont sent Stefani some of his demos as a peace offering. The band returned to the studio to create more upbeat songs and penned "Ex-Girlfriend" and "Simple Kind of Life". More recording, audio mixing and audio mastering were done late that year, and David LaChapelle photographed the band for the album cover in January 2000.

The album's working title was originally announced as Magic's in the Makeup in May 1998 and later as Saturn Returns in November 1999. Stefani was confused by her feelings of depression and interest in Sylvia Plath while recording the album. Her boyfriend Gavin Rossdale told her that she was going through her Saturn return. Saturn's orbit takes 29.4 Earth years and, in astrology, the time when Saturn returns to its position during a person's birth is believed to be a period of self-evaluation. Stefani was born October 3, 1969, and many of the songs were written during her Saturn return.

Music and lyrics

The music of Return of Saturn further explores new wave style, while adding an alternative rock feel and maintaining some of the band's ska and reggae sounds. Adrian Young's drum part on "Simple Kind of Life" was mixed through low fidelity filters to give it the sound of a lo-fi power ballad. "Six Feet Under" and "Staring Problem" were described as a more self-aware return to the band's earlier material, a combination of work by new wave band Missing Persons and hard rock band Van Halen.

No Doubt experiments with several new styles on the album. "Ex-Girlfriend", which originally featured a Prince-style funk sound, was rewritten and includes rapped vocals over piano and flamenco guitar parts. After opening with Gabrial McNair's jazz funeral horn part over Young's beatboxing, "Bathwater" proceeds into a song written in swing time. It was described as a combination of the band's 2 Tone roots with the operatic slapstick of Gilbert and Sullivan. "Marry Me" features use of the tabla, a pair of tuned hand drums prominent in India. Young and bassist Tony Kanal's contributions were compared to the rhythm of nu metal music, and the fragmented progression of "Comforting Lie" was likened to the work of Korn.

The album's lyrics depict Stefani's maturation and femininity, reflected by images of oral contraceptives, a wedding cake and makeup on the album cover, as well as her romantic relationship with Rossdale. Her lyrics drew comparisons to the bitter, confessional styling of Hole frontwoman Courtney Love. "New" was written while the band was touring about the excitement of meeting Rossdale and her infatuation with him. Later compositions, however, discuss the problems that the two had maintaining a long-distance relationship. "Ex-Girlfriend" discusses a failing relationship, and "Suspension Without Suspense" and "Home Now" detail feelings of resentment, loneliness, and indecision. On "Simple Kind of Life", she confesses to hoping for a mistake with her birth control and a desire to leaving music for a domestic life. She contrasts this, however, with her need for independence:

Critical reception

Return of Saturn received generally positive reviews from music critics. At Metacritic, which assigns a normalized rating out of 100 to reviews from mainstream publications, the album received an average score of 68, based on 16 reviews. Entertainment Weeklys David Browne characterized the album as filled with "smoother, layered mid-tempo ballads as creamily textured as extra-thick napoleon pastries", but stated that Stefani's lyrics were too much of a throwback to the alternative rock scene of the early 1990s and contrasted with the boom of teen pop. Robert Christgau, writing for The Village Voice, described the emotions Stefani expressed as shallow, and the NME stated that her preoccupation with Rossdale was distracting and weakened the intense, Madonna-like character she had established on Tragic Kingdom. AllMusic critic Stephen Thomas Erlewine, however, called it "a terrific, layered record that exceeds any expectations set by Tragic Kingdom". Barry Walters from Rolling Stone referred to it as "a superstar follow-up that not only betters its predecessor but also radically departs from it." The publication included the album in its list of the top 50 albums of the year, describing it as "a record that charges ahead like gangbusters while biting its nails." Sal Cinquemani from Slant Magazine commented that although the album did not have any successful singles, Return of Saturn was "a solid album and proof of a healthy, genre-breaking future for No Doubt."

Commercial performance
Return of Saturn debuted at number two on the US Billboard 200, behind 'N Sync's No Strings Attached, and sold 202,000 copies in its first week. The Recording Industry Association of America (RIAA) certified the album platinum in May 2000, and as of July 2012, it had sold 1,587,000 copies in the United States. The album was successful in the modern rock market and its first two singles, "New" and "Ex-Girlfriend", reached the top 10 of the Billboard Modern Rock Tracks chart. It was less successful in the mainstream market, and "Simple Kind of Life" was the only single to chart on the Billboard Hot 100, where it peaked at number 38. The album was nominated for Best Rock Album at the 2001 Grammy Awards, but lost out to Foo Fighters' There Is Nothing Left to Lose. In Canada, it peaked at number two on RPM albums chart and number four on Billboard albums chart. Return of Saturn was awarded a Platinum certification by the Canadian Recording Industry Association (CRIA) in June 2000, denoting sales in excess of 100,000 copies.

Track listing
All tracks produced by Glen Ballard, except "New" produced by Jerry Harrison and No Doubt, "Too Late (Instrumental)" produced by Ballard and Matthew Wilder, and "Big Distraction" produced by Wilder.

Notes
 "Too Late (Instrumental)" is 4:56 and appears after one minute of silence after the end of the last credited song.
 "Dark Blue" is 4:36 on the international and Japanese editions.

Personnel
Credits adapted from the liner notes of Return of Saturn.

No Doubt
 Gwen Stefani – vocals
 Tony Kanal – bass guitar
 Tom Dumont – guitars
 Adrian Young – drums, percussion

Additional musicians
 Gabrial McNair – synthesizer, piano, all keyboard instruments, trombone, horn arrangements ; synthesizer programming 
 Stephen Bradley – trumpet
 Bryan Carrigan – synthesizer programming 
 Michael Boddicker – synthesizer programming 
 Theo "Hound Dog" Mondle – tablas 
 Orion Crawford – chart preparation
 Mike Garson – piano 
 Paul Buckmaster – string arrangements

Technical
 Glen Ballard – production 
 Jerry Harrison – production 
 No Doubt – production 
 Alain Johannes – recording 
 Karl Derfler – recording 
 Jack Joseph Puig – mixing
 Bob Ludwig – mastering
 Scott Campbell – additional recording
 Bryan Carrigan – additional recording
 Sean Beavan – additional recording ; sonic manipulation 
 Colin "Dog" Mitchell – pre-production recording, equipment coordination
 Jolie Levine-Aller – production coordination
 Rachel Cleverley – production assistance
 Matthew Wilder – production 
 Thom Panunzio – recording

Artwork
 David LaChapelle – photography
 Robert Fisher – design
 Joe Mama-Nitzberg – photography, art coordination
 Cindy Cooper – album package coordination

Charts

Weekly charts

Year-end charts

Certifications

References

2000 albums
Albums produced by Glen Ballard
Albums produced by Jerry Harrison
Albums produced by Matthew Wilder
Interscope Geffen A&M Records albums
Interscope Records albums
No Doubt albums
Trauma Records albums